The Real Thing is the second studio album by American recording R&B singer-songwriter Angela Winbush released under PolyGram Records in September 1989. It is the sophomore release after Winbush's debut album Sharp and features the R&B hit singles "It's The Real Thing", "Lay Your Troubles Down", and "No More Tears".

The album includes Winbush's cover of "I Have Learned to Respect the Power of Love", in which she wrote and produced for Stephanie Mills and appears on her 1985 self-titled album.

Track listing
All songs produced, written, arranged and performed by Angela Winbush, except where noted.

Personnel
Angela Winbush – Lead & Backing Vocals, Keyboards, Synthesizers, Piano, Programming, Synthesized Bass, Drums, Percussion, Drum Programming
Ronald Isley – Backing Vocals
 Angela Winbush, Katrina McKnight, Majela Walker, Rhonda Campbell, Jeff Lorenzen, Marvin Isley, Ronald Isley, Scotty Scott - Backing Vocals  (Track: 1)
Nathan East – Bass (Tracks: 4–8)
Sekou Bunch – Electric Bass (Tracks: 1–3)
John Robinson – Drums (Tracks: 4–6,8)
Rayford Griffin – Drums [Additional] (Tracks: 1–3)
Gerald Albright – Saxophone, Soloist (Tracks: 4–5)
Tony Maiden – Guitar: (Tracks: 1–3)
Paul Jackson, Jr. – Guitar (Tracks: 7,9)
Paulinho da Costa – Percussion: (Tracks: 4–6)
Greg "Fast Fingers" Phillinganes – Piano [Acoustic] (Tracks: 3–5)
Michael Schlesinger – Keyboards & Programming

Production
Executive Producer: Ronald Isley
Producer, Written-By, Arranger: Angela Winbush
Assistant Engineers: [Recording, Assisted By] Darin Prindle, Dennis Stefani, Mitch Gibson
Recorded & Engineered By Jeff Lorenzen
Mixed: Jeff Lorenzen
Mixing Assistant: Darin Prindle

References

1989 albums
Angela Winbush albums